Phalsbourg (Lorraine Franconian: Phalsburch) is a commune in the Moselle department in Grand Est in north-eastern France, with a population of about 5,000.

In 1911, it contained an Evangelical and a Roman Catholic church, a synagogue and a teachers' seminary. Its industries then included the manufacture of gloves, straw hats and liqueurs, and quarrying.

History 

The area of the city of Phalsbourg, originally Pfalzburg, was originally part of the principality of Lützelstein, under the overlordship of Luxembourg, then the bishops of Metz and of Strasbourg, before becoming possessed by the Dukes of Palantine Veldenz, all within the Holy Roman Empire of the German Nation. In 1570, Duke Georg Johann I of Palantine Veldenz founded the town of Pfalzburg as a refuge for Reformed Protestants expelled from of the Duchy of Lorraine, and as an administrative center of his holdings. But the cost forced him to sell the city and the surrounding district of Einarzhausen between 1583 and 1590 to Lorraine, the territory of which surrounded most of the area. In 1608, his successor Georg Gustav of Palantine Veldenz founded nearby Lixheim for Reformed refugees, but was also forced to sell the new town in 1623 to Lorraine.

From 1629 to 1660, Pfalzburg and Lixheim were combined as the Principality of Pfalzburg, for duchess Henriette of Lorraine (1605-1660) and her three successive husbands. The principality was acknowledged by Holy Roman Emperor Ferdinand II in 1629. After the death of Henriette, the principality returned to Lorraine. But the next year, Lorraine had to cede it to France in the Treaty of Vincennes in 1661, at a time when most of Lorraine was occupied by French troops since 1634.

The famous French military engineer Vauban reconstructed the town's fortifications in 1680. The town was of military importance as commanding one of the passes of the Vosges. The fortifications of Phalsbourg resisted the Allies in 1814 and 1815, and the Germans commanded by Taillant for four months during 1870, but they were taken on 12 December of that year, and have since been razed. The town was German again from 1871 to 1918, with its old name of Pfalzburg.

The United States Air Forces in Europe built an air base near the city in 1953. The base was returned in 1967 to the French government, which redesignated it as Camp de la Horie. The base is currently used by the French military's 1er Régiment d'Hélicoptères de Combat.

Events 
The town is home to the annual Erckmann-Chatrian summer festival. It is also the birthplace of Georges Mouton.

Climate 
Climate in this area has mild differences between highs and lows, and there is adequate rainfall year-round.  The Köppen Climate Classification subtype for this climate is "Cfb" (Marine West Coast Climate/Oceanic climate).

See also 
 Communes of the Moselle department

Notes

References 
 
Attribution

External links 
 

Communes of Moselle (department)
1570 establishments in the Holy Roman Empire
Populated places established in 1570
Three Bishoprics